AggroSantos.com is the debut studio album by English rapper Aggro Santos. It was released on 31 January 2011.

Critical reception 
Jon O'Brien from Allmusic gave the album three out of five stars and said "Santos will be able to adapt once his ubiquitous sound is considered passé, as an immediate snapshot of the 2011 musical climate, it's still a stylish and energetic debut." Metro Amy Dawson from commented, "Credibility be damned, reach for your glowstick and enjoy some uncomplicated party music."

Singles 
"Candy" (featuring Kimberly Wyatt) was released as the album's lead single. The song has been critically appreciated, with reviewers complimenting its chorus and synthpop beats associated with it. The song achieved commercial success peaking at number five in the United Kingdom and number fourteen in the Republic of Ireland. 
"Saint or Sinner" was released as the second single from the album. It received minor success than its predecessor charting only in the UK at number nineteen. The song has an old school garage feel associated with Portuguese and Spanish beats. 
"Like U Like" a collaboration with Girls Aloud member Kimberley Walsh, gave Santos his second top ten single in the United Kingdom peaking at number eight and 13 at Ireland.

Track listing

A physical copy of the album allows access to exclusive content which includes videos for "Candy", "Stamina", "Saint or Sinner", "Like U Like" and "Rhythm N Flow" with behind the scenes features.

Chart performance 
The album performed poorly in the UK and Ireland, where the album failed to chart. In the UK it made number 155 and number 24 on the specialist UK R&B Chart.

Release history

References 

2011 debut albums